Snežana Maleševič (born 10 October 1985) is a Slovenian international footballer. She played for English FA Women's Premier League club Millwall Lionesses.

References

External links
 
Snežana Maleševič at UEFA

1985 births
Living people
Slovenian women's footballers
FA Women's National League players
Millwall Lionesses L.F.C. players
Slovenia women's international footballers
Women's association football defenders
Women's association football midfielders
Expatriate women's footballers in England
Expatriate women's footballers in Italy
Slovenian expatriate footballers
Slovenian expatriate sportspeople in England
Slovenian expatriate sportspeople in Italy
A.S.D. Calcio Chiasiellis players
ŽNK Krka players